Coterie may refer to:

 A clique
 The Coterie, a British society
 Coterie (band), an Australian-New Zealand band
 a family group of black-tailed and Mexican prairie dogs
 in computer science, an antichain of sets which are pairwise intersecting